Jacques Van Thillo (born 21 December 1942) is a Belgian coxswain. He competed at the 1956 Summer Olympics in Melbourne with the men's coxed pair where they were eliminated in the semi-final.

References

1942 births
Living people
Belgian male rowers
Olympic rowers of Belgium
Rowers at the 1956 Summer Olympics
People from Borgerhout
Coxswains (rowing)